Leverton railway station was a station between North Leverton with Habblesthorpe and South Leverton, Nottinghamshire, England which closed in November 1959.  The line was reopened in 1967 for freight trains serving Cottam power stations, although the rest of line, through to Saxilby and Lincoln  via Torksey, closed to passengers in November 1959.
The final train was a railtour from Clapham Junction, in September 2019. The line is now officially closed, with the barrier boom arms having been removed at Leverton AHBC, and Westbrecks AHBC. The rails have since turned brown, and are unlikely to be used again.

Several accidents happened at the crossing adjacent to the station, culminating in a near collision with a school bus in January 1970, before automatic half-barriers were later fitted.

References

External links
 Leverton signalbox with photos and map of station and windmill
 1947 one inch to one mile map showing station, windmill and line
 Geograph photos - line from level crossing, level crossing, Railway Inn, demolished Railway Inn

Disused railway stations in Nottinghamshire
Former Great Central Railway stations
Railway stations in Great Britain opened in 1850
Railway stations in Great Britain closed in 1959